Kantyukovka (Qantük) is a rural locality (a selo) in Naumovsky Selsoviet, Sterlitamaksky District, Bashkortostan, Russia. The population was 312 as of 2010. There are 6 streets.

Geography 
Kantyukovka is located 26 km south of Sterlitamak (the district's administrative centre) by road. Vasilyevka is the nearest rural locality.

References 

Rural localities in Sterlitamaksky District